A spica splint is a type of orthopedic splint used to immobilize the thumb and/or wrist while allowing the other digits freedom to move. It is used to provide support for thumb injuries (ligament instability, sprain or muscle strain), gamekeeper's thumb, osteoarthritis, de Quervain's syndrome or fractures of the scaphoid, lunate, or first metacarpal. It is also suitable for post-operative use or after removal of a hand/thumb cast.

References

Medical equipment